Bown is a surname. Notable people with the surname include:

 Andy Bown (born 1946), English musician
 Archie Bown (1882–1958), English football (soccer) striker
 Arthur Bown (1851–1916), English architect
 Chuck Bown (born 1954), NASCAR champion
 Heather Bown (born 1978), American volleyball player
 Henry Edwin Bown (1845–1881), English architect
 Jane Bown (born 1925), British photographer
 Jim Bown (born 1960), NASCAR driver
 John Young Bown (1821–1890), Canadian physician
 Paul Bown (born 1957), British actor
 Ralph Bown (1891–1971), noted American radio pioneer
 Stuart Bown (born 1978), Australian rules footballer

See also
 Bowne (surname)
 Bowen (surname)
 Bowens (surname)